Elton John (born 1947) is an English singer, songwriter, pianist and composer.

Elton John may also refer to:
 Elton John (album), by Elton John, 1970
 Elton John (footballer) (born 1987), Trinidadian professional footballer

See also
 
 John Elton (died 1751), British shipbuilder and seaman
 John Elton Coon (1907–1993), American politician in Louisiana
 John Prince Elton (1809–1864), American businessman
 Ernest John Elton; full name of Ernest Elton (1893–1958), British WWI flying ace